Coproporus is a genus of beetles belonging to the family Staphylinidae.

The genus has cosmopolitan distribution.

Species:
 Coproporus abessinus Bernhauer, 1915 
 Coproporus albicornis (Sahlberg, 1844)

References

Staphylinidae
Staphylinidae genera